The English cricket team toured New Zealand from 4 February to 26 March 2013, their first tour of New Zealand since 2008. The tour consisted of three Twenty20 International matches, three One Day Internationals and three Test matches; the Test series saw the teams contest the Astle–Atherton Trophy for the first time. No man of the match awards were given in the T20I or ODI series, with prize money being given to charity instead.

On the fifth day of the 3rd Test, Stuart Broad set a new record for the longest time spent at the crease without scoring a run, with 103 minutes out in the middle. The previous record was 101 minutes, set by New Zealander Geoff Allott against South Africa in 1999.

Squads

Tour matches

T20: New Zealand XI v England XI

T20: New Zealand XI v England XI

T20: New Zealand XI v England XI

First-class: New Zealand XI v England XI

T20I series

1st T20I

2nd T20I

3rd T20I

ODI series

1st ODI

2nd ODI

3rd ODI

Test series

1st Test

2nd Test

3rd Test

Statistics

ODI
England
Joe Root became the first man ever to score 30 or more runs in each of his first six innings when he scored 79* in the 2nd ODI.
Graeme Swann took his 100th ODI wicket when he caught and bowled James Franklin in the 3rd ODI.

New Zealand
Ross Taylor scored his 7th ODI century when he scored 100 in the 2nd ODI.

Test
England
Jonathan Trott reached 3,000 Test career runs when he scored 45 in the 1st innings of the 1st Test.
Alastair Cook scored his 24th Test century when he scored 116 in the 2nd innings of the 1st Test.
Nick Compton scored his first Test century when he scored 117 in the 2nd innings of the 1st Test.
Nick Compton scored his second Test century when he scored 100 in the 1st innings of the 2nd Test.
Jonathan Trott scored his ninth Test century when he scored 121 in the 1st innings of the 2nd Test.
Steven Finn took his fourth five-wicket haul (6/125) in the 1st innings of the 3rd Test.
Matt Prior scored his seventh Test century when he scored 110 in the 2nd innings of the 3rd Test.

New Zealand
Bruce Martin took his first Test wicket when he got Matt Prior out in the 1st innings of the 1st Test.
Hamish Rutherford scored his first Test century (on debut) when he scored 171 in the 1st innings of the 1st Test.
Peter Fulton scored his first Test century when he scored 136 in the 1st innings of the 3rd Test.
Trent Boult got his first five-wicket haul when he took six wickets in the 1st innings of the 3rd Test.
Peter Fulton scored his second Test century when he scored 105 in the 2nd innings of the 3rd Test.

References

External links
 New Zealand v England in 2012/13 at ESPNcricinfo.com

2012–13 New Zealand cricket season
International cricket competitions in 2012–13
2012-13
2013 in New Zealand cricket
2013 in English cricket